Pattanapong Sripramote (Thai พัฒนพงษ์ ศรีปราโมทย์) is a Thai retired football player. He is defender who scored 7 goals for the Thailand national team, including a hat-trick in 1996 Asian Cup Qualification against Maldives. He is the current manager of Thai League 2 club Rajpracha.

International goals

Managerial statistics

References 

1974 births
Living people
Pattanapong Sripramote
Pattanapong Sripramote
1996 AFC Asian Cup players
Pattanapong Sripramote
Southeast Asian Games medalists in football
Association football defenders
Competitors at the 1993 Southeast Asian Games
Competitors at the 1995 Southeast Asian Games
Competitors at the 1997 Southeast Asian Games
Competitors at the 1999 Southeast Asian Games
Footballers at the 1998 Asian Games
Footballers at the 1994 Asian Games
Pattanapong Sripramote